Geholaspis mandibularis is a species of mite in the family Macrochelidae. It is found in Europe.

References

Macrochelidae
Articles created by Qbugbot
Animals described in 1904